Howard Edward Glover (February 14, 1935 – June 15, 2021) was a Canadian professional ice hockey right winger. He played 144 games in the National Hockey League (NHL) with four teams between 1958 and 1969. The rest of his career, which lasted from 1955 to 1970, was spent in the minor leagues.  His brother, Fred Glover, was also a player and coach in the NHL.

Playing career
Glover played for the following teams during his career: Toronto Marlboros, Barrie Flyers, Cleveland Barons, Toledo-Marion Mercurys, Winnipeg Warriors, Chicago Black Hawks, Calgary Stampeders, Buffalo Bisons, Detroit Red Wings, Pittsburgh Hornets, New York Rangers and Montreal Canadiens.

Glover spent parts of five seasons in the NHL during the 1950s and 60s. In 144 regular season games, Glover recorded 29 goals and 17 assists for a career total of 46 points. The majority of his career was spent in the AHL where he was an impressive goal scorer. Glover recorded a career high 41 goals with the Cleveland Barons during the 1967–68 season.

Howie Glover was inducted to the Greater Cleveland Sports Hall of Fame along with his brother Fred in 2008. He died on June 15, 2021.

Career statistics

Regular season and playoffs

References

External links
 

1935 births
2021 deaths
Buffalo Bisons (AHL) players
Calgary Stampeders (WHL) players
Canadian ice hockey left wingers
Chicago Blackhawks players
Cleveland Barons (1937–1973) players
Detroit Red Wings players
Kitchener Greenshirts players
Montreal Canadiens players
New York Rangers players
Pittsburgh Hornets players
Ice hockey people from Toronto
Toledo Mercurys players
Toronto Marlboros players
Winnipeg Warriors (minor pro) players